Lalgudi is a town in Tiruchirapalli district in the Indian state of Tamil Nadu. The town of Lalgudi heads the Lalgudi taluk, Lalgudi division, Lalgudi Educational District, Lalgudi DSP and Lalgudi Constituency (1952 onwards).

Etymology 
The term lalgudi consists of two words – lal means "red" and gudi means "tower".

Geography

Lalgudi is a town located around 20 km from Tiruchirapalli on NH-227 Tiruchirapalli-Chidambaram. Lalgudi lies close to the Kollidam River.  Ayyan Vaikal is the river passing through Lalgudi.

Demographics

Population 
 India census, Lalgudi had a population of 21,204.  Males constitute 50% of the population and females 50%.  Lalgudi has an average literacy rate of 81%, higher than the national average of 59.5%: male literacy is 86%, and female literacy is 76%. In Lalgudi, 10% of the population is under 6 years of age.

Government and politics  
Lalgudi assembly constituency is one of the original constituencies in the state of Tamil Nadu formerly known as madras state. (from 1952 onwards). From the year of 2009 Lalgudi Constituency is part of Perambalur (Lok Sabha constituency).

Culture/Cityscape

Landmarks 
Lalgudi (Thiruthavathurai)is famous for its temples. The Shiva Temple (Saptharishieeswarar temple) is one of the early Chola period temples, and the Tamil Appar is said to have visited this temple. The statue of Lingam, the main god of the temple, is quite different from other Lingams: It has a vertical wedge-like cut on the top which is red in colour. The statue is of rock, as is this redness on the head of Lingam. There is a mythological story behind the redness of this Lingam. This temple's (sanctum sanctorum) was built in the year 810 AD comparatively older than Thanjavur Big temple. 

There is a Shiva Temple 4 km from Lalgudi, at a village named Senni Vaikkal. The temple's date of construction is unknown. The main deity is Meenakshi Sundareswarar. The Main deity is a huge Lingam made of Maragatham (Emarald)with 'Karupacchai'(black green color) color. The lingam is really huge and the vibration in the temple is soul stirring.

Transport

By Air  
The nearby airport is Tiruchirapalli International Airport just 25–30 km from the town of lalgudi.

By Rail  
Through a rail network the town is well connected with the major cities like Chennai, Tiruchirapalli, Madurai, Dindigul, and the towns like Ariyalur, Srirangam, Villupuram, Cuddalore.

By Road  
Every two minutes there is a regular bus which connects the town with the intra-city terminal of its district headquarters (Chathiram bus stand) otherwise (main guard gate). And there is regular buses to reach the towns of Perambalur, Ariyalur, Jayankondam, Chidambaram, Thiruvaiyaru, Cuddalore, Puducherry and some buses to reach the cities like Thanjavur, Chennai, Dindigul, Tirupur Karur, Madurai and Coimbatore. The town connects with the nearby villages, with numerous town and mini buses.

Education 

The town of Lalgudi heads the Educational District of Lalgudi which comprises the taluks of Lalgudi and Manachanallur. The government-operated Lalgudi Boys Higher Secondary School and the Management-operated Girls Higher Secondary School are major schools at which most of the rural boys and girls study. Other schools include Panchayat Union Middle School, St. Anne's Primary Convent, St. Anne's Girls High school, Government Elementary Schools near Omakulam (near the police station, 1st cross - Paramasivapuram, Nannimangalam), Lions Mat Higher Secondary School, Sri Vivekananda Matriculation School for the past 28 years. Government Boys Higher Secondary School is more than 100 years old and one of the best Govt. Schools in the state.

A majority of students pursue higher education only at Tiruchirapalli due to lack of standard institutions in Lalgudi. "Agricultural Engineering College and Research Institute" (AEC&RI) affiliated with Tamil Nadu Agricultural University (TNAU) is functioning in Kumulur village in an area of 300 acres 4 km near to Lalgudi offering B.Tech. Agricultural Engineering.There is also a polytechnic college in Lalgudi - Mandhurai, many of the students travel to Trichy city every day by train to pursue their college education. A Government Arts & Science college (Bharathidasan University College) was opened in Paramasivapuram fourth cross and now it's shifted to Kumulur village.

Adjacent communities

Notable residents
 It is the birthplace of the famous female educationist PADMA BHUSHAN Shri N.Ramasami Ayyar. [ Founder of Padmabhushan Shri N.Ramasami Ayyar educational Complex, Trichy]
It is the birthplace of famous violinist Padma Bhushan Shri Lalgudi Jayaraman.
Lalgudi being in central part of Tamil Nadu was the headquarters of Pulavar Keeran during his hectic career for 20 years.
Writer La Sa Ra ( Lalgudi Saptarishi Ramamirtham) was from Lalgudi.
 Poet, translator, essayist, dramatist, editor M. Gopala Krishna Iyer is from Lalgudi.

See also
Edangimangalam Vellanur

References 

Cities and towns in Tiruchirappalli district